Columbia Square is one of the 22 squares of Savannah, Georgia, United States. It is located in the second row of the city's five rows of squares, on Habersham Street and East President Street. It is south of Warren Square and between Oglethorpe Square to the west and Greene Square to the east. The oldest building on the square is at 307 East President Street, today's 17 Hundred 90 Inn, which, as its name suggests, dates to the 18th century.

The square was laid out in 1799 and is named for Columbia, the poetic personification of the United States. In the center of the square is a fountain that formerly stood at Wormsloe, the estate of Noble Jones, one of Georgia's first settlers. It was moved to Columbia Square in 1970 to honor Augusta and Wymberly DeRenne, descendants of Jones. It is sometimes called the "rustic fountain," as it is decorated with vines, leaves, flowers, and other woodland motifs.

Irish immigrant William Kehoe built a house on the eastern side of the square, at 130 Habersham Street, in 1885. After both his business and his family expanded, he built a larger home, completed in 1892, diagonally across the square at 123 Habersham Street.

The Timothy Bonticou Double House, at 418–420 East State Street, was moved one block south from 419–421 East Broughton Lane in 1972.

The office of Historic Savannah Foundation is in the southwest tything of the square, at 321 East York Street.

Dedication

Markers and structures

Constituent buildings

Each building below is in one of the eight blocks around the square composed of four residential "tything" blocks and four civic ("trust") blocks, now known as the Oglethorpe Plan. They are listed with construction years where known.

Northwestern tything/residential block
Isaiah Davenport House, 324 East State Street (1820) – built by Isaiah Davenport

Northwestern trust/civic block
Kehoe House (2), 123 Habersham Street (1892)

Southwestern trust/civic block
307 East President Street – central portion (built 1790) is the oldest building on the square; eastern portion (1823) built for Steele White; western portion (1888) built for Anna Powers; now the home of the 17 Hundred 90 Inn
Frederick Heineman House, 125–127 Habersham Street (1842)

Southwestern tything/residential block
Abraham Sheftall House, 321 East York Street (1818) – now the home of Historic Savannah Foundation
Thomas Morgan House, 313–315 East York Street (1885)
Jerome H. Wilson Property, 307–311 East York Street (1873)
Joseph Gammon Property, 134 Lincoln Street (1843)

Northeast tything/residential block
Francis M. Stone House, 402 East State Street (1821)
"Laura's Cottage", 416 East State Street (1799–1808) –  moved from Greene Ward; built by Isaiah Davenport; set back from the street, almost behind 418–420
Timothy Bonticou Double House, 418–420 East State Street (1854–1861) – moved from 419–421 East Broughton Lane in 1972
Henry W. Willink House, 422–424 East State Street (1850)

Northeast trust/civic block
Abraham Scribner House, 424 East President Street (1810) – remodeled in 1899

Southeastern trust/civic block
Kehoe House (1), 130 Habersham Street (1885)
Green Fleetwood House, 128 Habersham Street (1854)

Southeastern tything/residential block
Frederick Ball House, 136 Habersham Street (1805)
409 East York Street (1880)

Gallery

References

Columbia Square, Savannah
1799 establishments in Georgia (U.S. state)